Justin Gimelstob and Richey Reneberg were the defending champions, but Gimelstob did not participate this year.  Reneberg partnered Jared Palmer, successfully defending his title.

Palmer and Reneberg defeated Patrick Galbraith and David Macpherson 6–3, 7–5 in the final.

Seeds

Draw

Draw

External links
 Draw

Tennis Channel Open
2000 ATP Tour
Franklin Templeton Tennis Classic – Doubles
2000 Tennis Channel Open